Yves Séguin (born March 30, 1951, in Val-d'Or, Quebec) is a former Canadian politician in Quebec.

He was first elected as the Quebec Liberal Party (QLP) member for Montmorency in 1985.  He was the parliamentary assistant to the Minister of Revenue from 1985 to 1987.  He was then made the Minister of Revenue himself in 1987.  He was also made the Minister of Labour in 1988.  He resigned from both positions in 1990.

After serving in various private capacities, he re-entered public life, winning a seat in Outremont in 2003.  He was appointed Minister of Finance by Jean Charest.  He served in this position until his resignation in 2005.  He resigned as a Member of National Assembly soon after.

In 2005, he presided the Commission on the Fiscal Imbalance for the Québec government, which held public hearings on the matter.

Electoral record

References

Quebec Liberal Party MNAs
1951 births
Living people
People from Val-d'Or
Academic staff of the Université du Québec à Montréal
21st-century Canadian politicians
Finance ministers of Quebec